The Third Position is a set of neo-fascist political ideologies that were first described in Western Europe following the Second World War. Developed in the context of the Cold War, it developed its name through the claim that it represented a third position between the capitalism of the Western Bloc and the communism of the Eastern Bloc.

Between the 1920s and 1940s, various dissident groups presented themselves as part of a movement distinct from both capitalism and Marxist socialism. This idea was revived by various political groups following the Second World War. The rhetoric of the "Third Position" developed among Terza Posizione in Italy and Troisième Voie in France; in the 1980s, it was taken up by the National Front in the United Kingdom. These groups emphasize opposition to both communism and capitalism. Advocates of Third Position politics typically present themselves as "beyond left and right" while syncretizing ideas from each end of the political spectrum, usually reactionary right-wing cultural views and left-wing economic views.

History 

The term "Third Position" was coined in Europe and the main precursors of Third Position politics were Italian fascism, Prussian socialism, National Bolshevism (a synthesis of far-right ultranationalism and far-left Bolshevism) and Strasserism (a radical, mass-action, worker-based, socialist form of Nazism, advocated by the "left-wing" of the Nazi Party by brothers Otto and Gregor Strasser, until it was crushed in the Night of the Long Knives in 1934). Neo-fascist, neo-Nazi author Francis Parker Yockey had proposed an alliance between communists and fascists called red-brown alliance (red being the color of communism and brown being the color of Nazism) which would have been anti-Semitic, anti-American, and anti-Zionist in nature. Yockey lent support to Third World liberation movements as well.

Germany 
Querfront ("cross-front") was the cooperation between conservative revolutionaries in Germany with the far-left during the Weimar Republic of the 1920s. 

Ernst Niekisch and others tried to combine communist and anti-capitalist nationalist forces to overthrow the existing order of the Weimar Republic. He called this merger "National Bolshevism".

Germany's Chancellor, General Kurt von Schleicher (in office 1932–33), attempted to induce the more left-wing Strasserist segment of the Nazi Party to merge with the trade unions as way of forcing Hitler to support his government, but his plan failed.

The term is also used today for mutual entryism or cooperation between left and right-wing groups. For example, at a Berlin peace rally on February 24, 2023 called by Sahra Wagenknecht leading figure of Germany's socialist Left Party, die Linke, and feminist Alice Schwarzer in support of their manifesto calling for negotiations and stop of military support of the Ukraine, far-right factions and pro-Russian supporters were in attendance.

France 

During the 1930s and 1940s, a number of splinter groups from the radical left became associated with radical nationalism. Jacques Doriot's French Popular Party (from the French Communist Party) and Marcel Déat's National Popular Rally (from the French Section of the Workers' International). Third Position ideology gained some support in France, where in 1985 Jean-Gilles Malliarakis set up a "Third Way" political party, Troisième Voie (TV). Considering its main enemies to be the United States, communism and Zionism, the group advocated radical paths to national revolution. Associated for a time with the Groupe Union Défense, TV was generally on poor terms with Front National until 1991, when Malliarakis decided to approach them. As a result, TV fell apart and a radical splinter group under Christian Bouchet, Nouvelle Résistance, adopted National Bolshevik and then Eurasianist views.

Italy 

In Italy, the Third Position was developed by Roberto Fiore, along with Gabriele Adinolfi and Peppe Dimitri, in the tradition of Italian neo-fascism. Third Position's ideology is characterized by a militarist formulation, a palingenetic ultranationalism looking favourably to national liberation movements, support for racial separatism and the adherence to a soldier lifestyle. In order to construct a cultural background for the ideology, Fiore looked to the ruralism of Julius Evola and sought to combine it with the desire for a cultural-spiritual revolution. He adopted some of the positions of the contemporary far-right, notably the ethnopluralism of Alain de Benoist and the Europe-wide appeal associated with such views as the Europe a Nation campaign of Oswald Mosley (amongst others). Fiore was one of the founders of the Terza Posizione movement in 1978. Third Position ideas are now represented in Italy by Forza Nuova, led by Fiore; and by the movement CasaPound, a network of far-right social centres.

United Kingdom 

In the 1980s, the National Front, a British fascist party that had experienced the height of its success in the 1970s, was taken over by a Strasserist faction that referred to themselves as Third Positionist. The Strasserist-led National Front was also characterised by Baker as National Bolshevist in ideology. Reflecting the Nouvelle Droite's influence, the Strasserist Official NF promoted support for "a broad front of racialists of all colours" who were seeking an end to multi-racial society and capitalism, praising black nationalists like Louis Farrakhan and Marcus Garvey. Their publication, Nationalism Today, featured positive articles on the governments of Libya and Iran, presenting them as part of a global anti-capitalist and anti-Marxist third force in international politics; its members openly acknowledged the influence of Libyan leader Muammar Gaddafi and his Third International Theory. This may have had tactical as well as ideological motivations, with Libya and Iran viewed as potential sources of funding. This new rhetoric and ideology alienated much of the party's rank-and-file membership. It experienced internal problems, and in 1989 several of its senior members—Nick Griffin, Derek Holland, and Colin Todd—split from it to establish their International Third Position group. One of its leaders was Roberto Fiore, an ex-member of the Italian far-right movement Third Position.

United States 
In the United States, Political Research Associates argues that Third Position politics has been promoted by some white nationalist and neo-Nazi groups such as the National Alliance, American Front, Traditionalist Worker Party, Patriot Front, and White Aryan Resistance, as well as some black nationalist groups, such as the Nation of Islam, since the late 20th century. In 2010, the American Third Position Party (later renamed American Freedom Party) was founded in part to channel the right-wing populist resentment engendered by the financial crisis of 2007–08 and the policies of the Obama administration.

See also 
 
 Anti-corporate activism
 Alt-right
 Beefsteak Nazi
 Fascism
 Franco Freda
 Getúlio Vargas
 Ideology of the Committee of Union and Progress
 Kemalism
 Metaxism
 MIÉP–Jobbik Third Way Alliance of Parties
 National-anarchism
 National Bolshevism
 New antisemitism
 Nouvelle Droite
 Peronism
 Producerism
 Red–green–brown alliance
 Strasserism
 Syncretic politics
 Yellow socialism
 The Fourth Political Theory

References

Footnotes

Sources 

 
 Cheles, L.; Ferguson, R.; and Vaughan, M. (1992) Neo-Fascism in Europe. London: Longman.
 Cingolani, Giorgio (1996) La destra in armi. Editori Riuniti. (in Italian).
 Copsey, N. (2004) Contemporary British Fascism: The British National Party and the Quest for Legitimacy. Basingstoke: Palgrave Macmillan.
 
 
 Flamini, Gianni (1989) L’ombra della piramide. Teti. (in Italian).
 International Third Position (1997) The Third Position Handbook. London: Third Position.

External links 
 Political Research Associates. What is the Third Position?, on PublicEye.org (2000).
 Southern Poverty Law Center. Third Position on the Web.

 
Anti-capitalism
Anti-corporate activism
Authoritarianism
Cold War terminology
Economic ideologies
Neo-fascism
Syncretic political movements
Anti-communism
Far-right politics